Vasily Vladimirovich Pogreban (born 26 June 1989) is a Russian sprint canoeist. Competing in two-man (K-2) and four-man (K-4) events he won two medals at the world championships, including a gold in 2013, and silver medals at the 2015 European Games and 2016 European Championships. He placed ninth in the K-4 1000 m event at the 2016 Summer Olympics.

References

External links

 

1989 births
Living people
Russian male canoeists
Olympic canoeists of Russia
Canoeists at the 2016 Summer Olympics
Canoeists at the 2015 European Games
European Games medalists in canoeing
European Games silver medalists for Russia
ICF Canoe Sprint World Championships medalists in kayak
Universiade medalists in canoeing
Universiade silver medalists for Russia
Medalists at the 2013 Summer Universiade
People from Grigoriopol